Kim Wells may refer to:

Politics
 Kim Wells (Kansas politician) (Born 1949), Kansas Republican Party chairman
 Kim Wells (Victoria politician) (Born 1958), Treasurer of Victoria

Sports
 Kimberley Wells (Born 1985), Australian Cyclist